Night Side is a collection of short stories written by Joyce Carol Oates. It was published in 1977 by Vanguard Press.

The stories are unified by interrelated themes which she names in the collection's epigraph, Walt Whitman's poem "A Clear Midnight:"This is thy hour O soul,

thy free flight into the wordless,

Away from books, away from art,

the day erased, the lesson done

Thee fully forth emerging, silent, gazing,

pondering the themes thou lovest best:

Night, sleep, death and the stars.In fact the stories are less concerned with everyday reality than with the "night-side" of the human mind, the area psychologists usually refer a to as "the unconscious," and its effects on a character's life.

Stories 

 "Night-Side"
 "A Theory of Knowledge"
 "The Thaw"
 "The Murder"
 "Daisy"
 "Exile"
 "Famine Country"
 "Fatal Woman"
 "Further Confessions"
 "The Translation"
 "The Blessing"
 "The Giant Woman"
 "The Widows"
 "The Dungeon"
 "The Sacrifice"
 "The Snow-Storm"
 "The Lover"
 "Bloodstains"

References 

Short story collections by Joyce Carol Oates
1977 short story collections
Vanguard Press books